The Gonzo is an undergraduate satire/humor publication founded in 1993 at Georgetown University in Washington, DC. 

The first editor-in-chief of The Gonzo and its founder is Richard Diefenbeck, Jr.,  a continuing education student at Georgetown University who went on to write for Andrei Codrescu and created the first picture blog ever at Dr. Menlo Blogs From Space!. His successor, Shlomi Raz, ran the publication between 1994-1996.  Dan Alamariu co-ran the paper with John Mathiesen during 1996. Finally, John Mathiesen co-ran the publication with Micah Sachs until its final issue in 1998.

Cultural impact
"Every time you masturbate... God kills a kitten" originally appeared as the cover of The Gonzo in 1996 and has been used extensively since its rediscovery in 2002.

Justin Hall, pioneer blogger, listed The Georgetown Gonzo and said of it, "I believe this was the first college humour magazine published online. I don't know that they've done much with it since."

The original tagline to The Gonzo (penned by Diefenbeck aka "Homer"), launched in 1993, was "The Most Important Paper in the World". The Daily Show tagline from 1996 to September 11, 2001 was "The most important television program...ever."

References

External links
The Georgetown Gonzo (via archive.org

College humor magazines
Magazines established in 1993
Magazines published in Washington, D.C.
Satirical magazines published in the United States
Student magazines published in the United States